Rafael Naranjo (born 6 June 1943) is a Venezuelan footballer. He played in six matches for the Venezuela national football team from 1967 to 1969. He was also part of Venezuela's squad for the 1967 South American Championship.

References

1943 births
Living people
Venezuelan footballers
Venezuela international footballers
Place of birth missing (living people)
Association football defenders
Asociación Civil Deportivo Lara players